Toshihide is a masculine Japanese given name.

Possible writings
Toshihide can be written using different combinations of kanji characters. Here are some examples: 

敏英, "agile, hero"
敏秀, "agile, excellence"
敏栄, "agile, prosperous"
俊英, "talented, hero"
俊秀, "talented, excellence"
俊栄, "talented, prosperous"
寿英, "long life, hero"
寿秀, "long life, excellence"
寿栄, "long life, prosperous"
寿日出, "long life, sunrise"
利英, "benefit, hero"
利秀, "benefit, excellence"
年英, "year, hero"
年日出, "year, sunrise"
年栄, "year, prosperous" 

The name can also be written in hiragana としひで or katakana トシヒデ.

Notable people with the name

, Japanese rogue trader
, Japanese theoretical physicist
, Japanese tennis player
, Japanese ukiyo-e artist
, Japanese footballer
, Japanese sumo wrestler
, Japanese sumo wrestler
, Japanese actor

Japanese masculine given names